The 1971 VMI Keydets football team was an American football team that represented the Virginia Military Institute (VMI) as a member of the Southern Conference (SoCon) during the 1971 NCAA University Division football season. In their first year under head coach Bob Thalman, the team compiled an overall record of 1–10 with a mark of 1–4 in conference play, placing sixth in the SoCon. After serving as a defensive assistant under Vito Ragazzo for two years, Thalman was promoted to head coach of the Keydets in December 1970.

Schedule

References

VMI
VMI Keydets football seasons
VMI Keydets football